The Naval Hospital Bremerton (NHB) is a United States Navy hospital located on Naval Station Bremerton in Bremerton, Washington. Naval Hospital Bremerton is a fully accredited, community-based acute care and obstetrical hospital, currently operating 25 in-patient beds and hosting a variety of ambulatory, acute and specialty clinics.

References

Buildings and structures in Kitsap County, Washington
Medical installations of the United States Navy
Naval installations in Washington (state)
Military hospitals in the United States